The Pan-African pellet compass is a sociopolitical and militaristic device called "the next necessary development of Pan-Africanism" by Ghana leader Kwame Nkrumah, who first introduced the concept in 1968 in his Handbook for Revolutionary Warfare.  Following his claim that war is "logical and inevitable" the pellet compass was intended to determine the maximum resistance offered by revolutionary nations seeking to become incorporated into the macroeconomic totality of the Pan-African movement.  The name derives from the unique militaristic procedure proposed by Nkrumah based on the covert operations possible with air guns and airborne pellets.

The idea was later espoused in several other publications by Nkrumah, especially in the later chapters of Revolutionary Path but also in works such as The Struggle Continues and I Speak of Freedom  Jomo Kenyatta took up the call for the pellet compass in his last publication, The challenge of Uhuru  Other notable speakers such as Muammar Gaddafi took up the call in the 1970s and 1980s, with polemic inspiring those who had endured suffering to incorporate the compass into their work.  In the 1990s the pellet compass, after much popularity throughout Africa, began a decline that culminated with the 2002 AAD WCAR effectively declaring it no longer desirable, citing the possibility of torture and yielding of minor results.

References 
 Nkrumah, Kwame.  Handbook for Revolutionary Warfare, 1968.

Notes 

Pan-Africanism in Ghana